Frances Howard, Countess of Surrey ( de Vere; c. 1517 – 30 June 1577) was the daughter of John de Vere, 15th Earl of Oxford, and Elizabeth Trussell. She married firstly, Henry Howard, Earl of Surrey, son of Thomas Howard, 3rd Duke of Norfolk, and his wife Elizabeth Stafford, by whom she had two sons and three daughters:

Jane Howard, Countess of Westmorland (1533/1537 – buried 30 June 1593), who married Charles Neville, 6th Earl of Westmorland.
Thomas Howard, 4th Duke of Norfolk (10 March 1536 – 2 June 1572), married (1) Mary FitzAlan (2) Margaret Audley (3) Elizabeth Leyburne.
Henry Howard, 1st Earl of Northampton (25 February 1540 – 15 June 1614), who died unmarried.
Katherine Howard, Baroness Berkeley (d. 7 April 1596) who married Henry Berkeley, 7th Baron Berkeley.
Margaret Howard, Baroness Scrope of Bolton (b.1547) who married Henry Scrope, 9th Baron Scrope of Bolton.

Late in 1546, while Frances was expecting her fifth child (Margaret), her husband was accused of treason and he was subsequently executed in January 1547.

She married secondly, to Thomas Steyning, by whom she had two children, Henry and Mary. Mary Steyning married Charles Seckford.

She died at Earl Soham, Suffolk and was buried at Framlingham Church in Suffolk. In 1614, her first husband was later reburied next to her.

References

Further reading
 DeVere Family, Tudorplace.com.ar. Accessed 16 February 2008
stanford.edu Profile, stanford.edu. Accessed 23 May 2008
 Brenan, Gerald, and Edward Phillips Statham. googlebooks The House of Howard. London: Hutchinson & co, 1907. Retrieved 16 February 2008.

1516 births
1577 deaths
English countesses
British courtesy countesses
Daughters of British earls
16th-century English women
16th-century English nobility
Frances
Frances
Year of birth uncertain
Wives of knights